The Confederacy of Mainland Mi'kmaq is a Tribal Council in Nova Scotia, Canada. It was incorporated in 1986 and has its main office at Millbrook First Nation. It delivers community programs and advisory services to its members. It has eight member communities: Annapolis Valley, Bear River, Glooscap, Millbrook, Paq'tnkek, Pictou Landing, Sipekne'katik, and Acadia, the last of which joined in 2019.

See also
 Union of Nova Scotia Mi'kmaq - another tribal council in Nova Scotia

References

External links
Confederacy of Mainland Mi'kmaq website
Confederacy of Mainland Mi’kmaq, Development History

First Nations tribal councils
Mi'kmaq in Canada
Indigenous organizations in Nova Scotia